Rasbora hosii is a species of ray-finned fish in the genus Rasbora. It is endemic to West Kalimantan.

References 

Rasboras
Freshwater fish of Borneo
Taxa named by George Albert Boulenger
Fish described in 1895